is a former Japanese swimmer who competed in the 1988 Summer Olympics.

References

1966 births
Living people
Japanese male butterfly swimmers
Olympic swimmers of Japan
Swimmers at the 1988 Summer Olympics
Asian Games medalists in swimming
Swimmers at the 1986 Asian Games
Asian Games bronze medalists for Japan
Medalists at the 1986 Asian Games
20th-century Japanese people